The 1915–16 United States collegiate men's ice hockey season was the 22nd season of collegiate ice hockey.

Regular season

Standings

References

1915–16 NCAA Standings

External links
College Hockey Historical Archives

 
College